Akim Tafo is a town in the Abuakwa North Municipality of the Eastern Region of Ghana

Further developments
The headquarters of the cocoa research Institute of Ghana is in the Eastern Region

Location
Akyem/Akim Tafo  is just before Kukurantumi on the Koforidua-Bunso highway. It shares boundary with Kukruantumi, Maase, Anyinasi and Osiem.

Chief
Osabarima Adusei Peasah IV

References

See also

Populated places in the Eastern Region (Ghana)